Matt "Mojo" Morginsky (born June 14, 1976), is the lead vocalist of the Christian ska band The O.C. Supertones.

Early years
Matt Morginsky was born in Long Island to a Jewish father and an Italian mother. At age 14, he converted to Christianity. The following year, in January 1991, he arranged to meet Jason Carson, because he was interested in starting a Christian band.

Personal life
In 2011, Morginsky graduated from Covenant Theological Seminary in St. Louis, Missouri. He served as an assistant pastor at Denver Presbyterian Church in Denver, Colorado. He lives in Denver with his wife and four children. In later years he has served as the lead pastor at Grace and Peace Church in Northeast Denver, Colorado.

Musical career

Saved
Morginsky and Carson formed a band which at first was named "Saved". Ethan Luck joined the band on guitar, and Carson's friend, Tony Terusa, joined on bass guitar. During their formative years, the band had difficulty finding their musical style. By April 1995, they had decided to be a ska band, and the name was changed to "The O.C. Supertones."

The O.C. Supertones
From April 1995 to October 2005, Morginsky acted as the lead vocalist and songwriter of The O.C. Supertones, and occasionally played guitar and bass. The band temporarily disbanded in 2005. They released a new album and resumed touring in 2012 before disbanding permanently in 2017.

Other projects
In 2003, he also released an album with his and Ethan Luck's side project, Grand Incredible, in which he played bass guitar as well as being the lead singer.

In 2007, he released four songs on his Myspace, describing them as demos for his solo project.

Mojo & the Info

In January 2008, he announced that recording on his solo album had started. In April 2008, he released the album Doctorate in Cold Rockin' It: Mojo Goes to College was released under the artist name "Mojo & the Info" as a digital download on iTunes and Myspace. The album was recorded and mixed by former Supertones guitarist Ethan Luck.

In 2009, Morginsky revealed on the Mojo & the Info Myspace that he would be releasing some new songs in a joint project with Croatian Ska/Rock band "October Light", a band that he plays with overseas. They now go by the name "Mojo and October Light" and are currently mixing their new album, Everything Will Be Made Right that included a video for "Chemical Reaction" on YouTube.

See also
 The O.C. Supertones

References

External links
 MySpace - mojo - 33 - Male - NASHVILLE, TENNESSEE - myspace.com/mattmorginsky

1976 births
Converts to Protestantism from Judaism
Jewish American musicians
Jewish American songwriters
American performers of Christian music
Living people
Jews in punk rock
21st-century American singers
21st-century American male singers
The O.C. Supertones members
21st-century American Jews